Anthony Sylvester Luchetti, AM (27 May 1904 – 11 July 1984) was a long serving Australian federal member of parliament.

Born of Italian/Irish parentage in Lowther, New South Wales, Luchetti was educated in the Catholic school system before working in jobs as varied as miner and journalist.  Involved in the Australian Labor Party (ALP) from an early age, Luchetti was elected to the Lithgow City Council and served on the New South Wales ALP Executive from 1929 to 1931.

Luchetti developed a close friendship with the local federal Member of Parliament, the future Prime Minister Ben Chifley, and served as Chifley's campaign manager for the electoral Division of Macquarie for two elections.  However, following a split in the New South Wales Labor ranks led by New South Wales Premier Jack Lang, Luchetti, a Lang supporter, stood against Chifley.  The Labor vote split between the two candidates, enabling the opposition United Australia Party candidate, John Lawson, to win the seat.  The two would remain on less than cordial terms for the rest of Chifley's life.  Luchetti remained active in the Labor movement, however, and following the death of Chifley in 1951, Luchetti won Labor pre-selection for the Macquarie electorate and the subsequent by-election and served as the member for Macquarie until his retirement in 1975.

References

 Day, D. (2001) Chifley, Harper Collins, .

External links
 A 1959 image of Luchetti can be found here

1904 births
1984 deaths
Australian Labor Party members of the Parliament of Australia
Lang Labor politicians
Members of the Australian House of Representatives for Macquarie
Members of the Australian House of Representatives
Members of the Order of Australia
Australian miners
20th-century Australian politicians
Australian people of Italian descent
Australian people of Irish descent